Just Joe is a 1960 British comedy film directed by Maclean Rogers, and starring Leslie Randall, Joan Reynolds, Michael Shepley, and Anna May Wong. The unassuming Joe (Leslie Randall) discovers his heroic side when he becomes involved with spies chasing the secret formula of a new detergent.

Cast
 Leslie Randall as Joe
 Joan Reynolds as Sybil
 Michael Shepley as Fowler
 Anna May Wong as Peach Blossom
 Jon Pertwee as Prendergast
 Howard Pays as Rodney
 Martin Wyldeck as Bill
 Noel Dyson as Myra
 Bruce Seton as Charlie
 David Sale as Carruthers
 Betty Huntley-Wright as Miss Appleby

References

External links

1960 films
1960s English-language films
Films directed by Maclean Rogers
1960 comedy films
British comedy films
1960s British films